You and Me is the official theme song of the 2008 Summer Olympics held in Beijing, People's Republic of China, which was performed in the opening ceremony of the Olympics by Liu Huan and Sarah Brightman. Zhang Yimou, director of the opening ceremony, chose the British singer which represents the capital London as the next Olympic host city in 2012 and over a local one in keeping to the game's theme of "One World, One Dream", signifying unity across language, race or religious barriers.

The official version of this song lasts four minutes, ten seconds and was composed by Chen Qigang, a Shanghai born French-Chinese composer. The music video of this song features some people from around the world, their names in English and Chinese and lyrics appearing as sung.

The song was sampled at the 2022 Winter Olympics closing ceremony to help symbolize Beijing as both a Summer and Winter Olympic host city.

References

External links
 Song lyrics

2008 Summer Olympics
Olympic theme songs
Summer Olympic official songs and anthems
Sarah Brightman songs
2008 songs
Song articles with missing songwriters